David Hourn (born 9 September 1949) is an Australian cricketer. He played 44 first-class matches for New South Wales between 1970/71 and 1981/82.

Ian Chappell wrote in a 1977 article about Hourn and fellow spinner Jim Higgs: "in my opinion neither of them are real cricketers. By that I mean they are only bowlers, not cricketers. They are both well below standard as fieldsmen and batsmen." Poor eyesight and knee injuries later in his career did not help Hourn's batting and fielding. 

Hourn spun the ball sharply, especially when he bowled his wrong 'un, and could beat the best batsmen. His best seasons came in 1977-78 (49 wickets at 21.97) and 1978-79 (42 wickets at 31.71). Even though Australia's spin stocks had been depleted by defections to World Series Cricket, Hourn was not picked for any Australian teams, the selectors preferring Tony Mann, Bruce Yardley, Jim Higgs and Peter Sleep.

In 1975-76 he took 4 for 65 and 5 for 60 against Victoria. He injured his hand early during the 1977-78 season, but had a successful season, taking more wickets than anyone else in the Sheffield Shield, 48 wickets at 20.72, including figures of 7 for 71 and 5 for 42 against South Australia. The following season, he took 9 for 77 in the first innings against Victoria.

His later career was affected by problems with his bowling rhythm which led to his chronically over-stepping the crease. In one first-grade match for Waverley he bowled 26 no-balls. He took 629 wickets at an average of 19.56 in first-grade cricket for Waverley, a club record.

See also
 List of New South Wales representative cricketers

References

External links
 

1949 births
Living people
Australian cricketers
New South Wales cricketers
Cricketers from Sydney